Ginette Jany-Sendral (born 12 January 1932) is a French former swimmer. She competed at the 1948, 1952 and the 1956 Summer Olympics.

References

External links
 

1932 births
Living people
French female backstroke swimmers
French female freestyle swimmers
Olympic swimmers of France
Swimmers at the 1948 Summer Olympics
Swimmers at the 1952 Summer Olympics
Swimmers at the 1956 Summer Olympics
Place of birth missing (living people)
20th-century French women
21st-century French women